KWEB may refer to:

 KWEB-LP, a low-power radio station (98.5 FM) licensed to serve Webb City, Missouri, United States
 KFAN (AM), a radio station (1270 AM) licensed to serve Rochester, Minnesota, United States, which held the call sign KWEB from 1957 to 2011